Mangelia semen is a species of sea snail, a marine gastropod mollusk in the family Mangeliidae.

Description

Distribution
This marine species occurs off the Philippines.

References

 L.A. Reeve, Monograph of the genus Pleurotoma (1843–1846); Conchologia Iconica, or Illustrations of the shells of molluscous animals 1: 1–18.

External links
 

semen
Gastropods described in 1846